The April Novelization was a set of changes (constitutional amendments) to the 1952 Constitution of the People's Republic of Poland, agreed in April 1989, in the aftermath of the Polish Round Table Agreement.

Among key changes were:
restoration of the Senate of Poland and the post of the president of Poland (the latter annulling the power of the Polish United Workers' Party general secretary)
introduction of the National Council of the Judiciary (Krajowa Rada Sądownictwa)
changes to the electoral legislation, in order to make elections more free and fair
powers of the Sejm were adjusted

The 1952 constitution would be even further reformed by the December Novelization and Small Constitution of 1992, and finally replaced in 1997 by a completely new current Constitution of Poland.

External links
Law from 7 April 1989 "On amendments to the Constitution of the People's Republic of Poland (April Novelization)
Law from 29 December 1989 "On amendments to the Constitution of the People's Republic of Poland (the December Novelization)

References 

1989 documents
1989 in law
April 1989 events in Europe
Constitutions of Poland
Defunct constitutions
Legal history of Poland
1989 in Poland